Bray Tower is located on Valentia Island, County Kerry. The tower was built by the occupying English forces in 1815 in the fashion of a 16th-century Irish tower house.

Towers in the Republic of Ireland
Buildings and structures in County Kerry
Towers completed in 1815
1815 establishments in Ireland